John F. Bagley was an American football player and coach.  He served as the head football coach at Villanova College—now known as Villanova University—from 1897 to 1898, compiling a record of 5–9–2.

Head coaching record

References

Year of birth missing
Year of death missing
19th-century players of American football
Villanova Wildcats football coaches
Villanova Wildcats football players